General Lewis may refer to:

Andrew Lewis (soldier) (1720–1781), brigadier general in the American Revolutionary War
Bennett L. Lewis (born 1926), U.S. Army lieutenant general
Charles Algernon Lewis (1807–1904), British Army general
Duncan Lewis (born 1953), retired Australian Army general
Edward Mann Lewis (1863–1949), U.S. Army general
Fred P. Lewis (fl. 1970s–2000s), U.S. Air Force brigadier general
George Lewis (Royal Marines officer) (1774–1854), Royal Marines lieutenant general
Henry Balding Lewis (1889–1966), U.S. Army general
Homer I. Lewis (1919–2015), U.S. Air Force major general
John L. Lewis (politician) (1800–1886), Louisiana Militia general in the American Civil War
John Randolph Lewis (1834–1900), Union Army brevet brigadier general
John Taylor Lewis (1894–1983), U.S. Army general
Joseph Horace Lewis (1824–1904), Confederate States Army general
Kenneth Lewis (general) (c. 1929–1992), Canadian air force general
Levin Major Lewis (1832–1886), Confederate States Army general
Morgan Lewis (governor) (1754–1844), U.S. Army general in the War of 1812
Patricia C. Lewis, retired U.S. Air Force general
Robert A. Lewis (1917–1983), U.S. Army general
Rodney D. Lewis  (fl. 1990s–2020s), U.S. Air Force general
Ronald F. Lewis (born 1966), U.S. Army lieutenant general
William G. Lewis (1835–1901), Confederate States Army general

See also
Attorney General Lewis (disambiguation)